Luther Burrell (born 6 December 1989) is a professional rugby union footballer who last played as a  for the Newcastle Falcons in the Premiership Rugby.

He played rugby union for Leeds Carnegie (2006–2011), Sale Sharks (2011–2012) and Northampton Saints (2012–2019), and won 15 caps for England between 2014 and 2016. He switched codes and played for Warrington in 2019. Then returned to Rugby Union after signing for Newcastle Falcons in 2020

Background
Burrell was born in Huddersfield, West Yorkshire, England. He is of Jamaican descent.

Club career
Burrell studied at All Saints Catholic College and Huddersfield New College and started his career playing rugby league at U14 and U15 for the Huddersfield Giants before moving to Huddersfield Rugby Union Football Club.
He made his senior rugby union debut for Leeds Carnegie aged 19 in 2006–07, and went on to make 41 appearances for the club. His rugby development was aided by several spells on loan to Championship clubs, including Sedgley Park (2007/08) and Otley.
Burrell spent four seasons at Leeds before moving over the Pennines to Sale Sharks in 2011, and the following season he signed for Northampton Saints. At Saints he won the Aviva Premiership in the 2013–14 season, starting the final, and gained 7 England caps. He also represented the West Indies at sevens.

On 19 February 2019 it was announced that Burrell would be leaving Saints at the end of the 2018–19 season to join Warrington Wolves in July 2019.

On 20 September 2020, Burrell made a switch back to union code to sign for Newcastle Falcons in the Premiership Rugby on a two-year contract from the 2020-21 season.

International career
He was called up by Stuart Lancaster to represent England in May 2013 after his good form and an injury to another League convert Joel Tomkins.

In January 2014, he was named in the England starting XV for the 2014 Six Nations Championship opening game away to France on 1 February, where he scored his first international try in a 26–24 defeat, running onto a pass to go over and score under the posts.
A week later on 8 February, he scored his second try in two matches at Murrayfield against Scotland in a 20–0 win. He continued his fine form in the 2014 Six Nations by scoring another try in the 29–18 victory against defending champions Wales with a good finish in the corner, beating two Welsh defenders to latch on to a Billy Twelvetrees grubber-kick. On 27 August 2015, he was left out of England's 2015 World Cup squad.

In May 2016, Burrell was recalled to the England side under Eddie Jones and played in the summer Test at Twickenham against Wales. After scoring in the 20th minute of that game, Burrell was rewarded by being selected for England's tour of Australia and playing in the first game of their Test series win.

International tries

References

External links
SL profile
ESPN Profile
Premiership Rugby profile

1987 births
Living people
Black British sportsmen
England international rugby union players
English rugby league players
English rugby union players
English people of Jamaican descent
Huddersfield R.U.F.C. players
Leeds Tykes players
Northampton Saints players
Rugby league centres
Rugby league players from Huddersfield
Rugby union players from Huddersfield
Warrington Wolves players